The 2021–22 Manhattan Jaspers basketball team represented Manhattan College in the 2021–22 NCAA Division I men's basketball season. The Jaspers, led by 11th-year head coach Steve Masiello, played their home games at Draddy Gymnasium in Riverdale, New York as members of the Metro Atlantic Athletic Conference.

Previous season
The Jaspers finished the 2020–21 season 7–13, 6–12 in MAAC play to finish in a tie for ninth place. As the No. 10 seed in the MAAC tournament, they lost in the first round to No. 7 seed Fairfield.

Roster

Schedule and results

|-
!colspan=12 style=""| Regular season

|-
!colspan=9 style=""| MAAC tournament

Sources

References

Manhattan Jaspers basketball seasons
Manhattan Jaspers
Manhattan Jaspers basketball
Manhattan Jaspers basketball